The 2009 Gatorade Duels were a pair of  qualifying races for the 2009 Daytona 500, and were held on February 12, 2009, at the  Daytona International Speedway in Daytona Beach, Florida.

The races set the field for the 51st running of "The Great American Race", and are the only races in the NASCAR Sprint Cup that qualifies drivers and their teams for a points-paying race.  The top 35 drivers from the previous season automatically made "The Great American Race" regardless of position. Race one sets the field for spaces on the inside of the pole sitter (in this case, Martin Truex Jr.), which is locked in via the traditional two-lap process on February 8, while race two sets the field on the outside behind other front row driver. The field for race one consisted of the cars that qualified in odd-numbered positions (1st, 3rd, 5th, 7th, etc.) and race two conversely saw cars that qualified in even-numbered positions (2nd, 4th, 6th, 8th, etc.). All starting positions for the 500 were determined by the duels, except for the front row which is locked in after qualifying. In the races, the top two finishers not in the Top 35 from the previous season automatically qualify. The remaining cars are locked in via qualifying speeds, point owners exemptions and (if needed) a past champion's provisional going to the most recent past champion.

For the third consecutive year, a driver each from Joe Gibbs Racing and Hendrick Motorsports won the Duels.

Both races had spectacular finishes. In the first duel, Jeff Gordon beat out Tony Stewart, Joey Logano, Jimmie Johnson and Aric Almirola. That group was within .40 of a second within each other on the last lap. Race two had Kyle Busch holding off Mark Martin and Brian Vickers by .26 of a second over Martin and .264 of Vickers.

Results

Those in boldface were qualified as top two finishers not in 2008 owner points top 35 exemptions.
Also making race on speed:  Bill Elliott (#21), Regan Smith (#78), Travis Kvapil (#28).
Making race using champions provisional: Terry Labonte (#66).

Did not qualify

References

Gatorade Duels
Gatorade Duels
Gatorade Duels
NASCAR races at Daytona International Speedway